NewsNation is an American subscription television network owned by the Nexstar Media Group, and is the company's only wholly-owned, national cable-originated television channel. The channel runs a mixture of entertainment programming (consisting of comedy and drama series, and theatrical feature films) for most of the broadcast day and a straight-news format during the evening and overnight hours, and also on weekday mornings. Known for most of its history as Superstation WGN before becoming WGN America in 2008, it relaunched on March 1, 2021 as a cable news network named after its flagship news program. The channel's relaunch came as part of a planned expansion of its news programming.

In September 2018, the channel, then WGN America, was received by approximately 80 million households that subscribed to a pay television service throughout the United States (or 62.7% of households with at least one television set).

History

As a superstation
WGN America was originally established on November 9, 1978, when United Video Inc. began redistributing the signal of WGN-TV (channel 9) in Chicago to cable and satellite subscribers throughout the United States. This expanded the prominent independent station into America's second satellite-distributed national "superstation", after Atlanta-based WTBS became TBS.

As the national feed of WGN-TV, the channel broadcast a variety of programming seen on the Chicago signal, including sports (mainly Chicago Cubs and White Sox baseball, as well as Chicago Bulls basketball games); locally originated news, children's, religious and public affairs programs; movies; and syndicated series. The WGN local and national feeds originally maintained nearly identical program schedules, aside from some sporting events that were restricted to the Chicago-area signal under league policy restrictions. In the years following the January 1990 re-imposition of federal syndication exclusivity regulations, programming between the two feeds increasingly deviated as the WGN national feed incorporated alternative syndicated programming to replace shows on the WGN-TV schedule that were subjected to market exclusivity claims by individual television stations, and some local programs that the national feed chose not to clear; particularly from the late 2000s onward, as the WGN Chicago signal began expanding its local news programming and added lifestyle programs to its schedule.

On December 13, 2014, WGN America was converted by Tribune into a conventional basic cable network, at which time it started to be offered on cable providers within the Chicago market alongside its existing local carriage on satellite providers DirecTV and Dish Network. Simulcasts of WGN-TV's Chicago-originated local newscasts, news specials and public affairs programs, special events and sports telecasts – with the exception of a one-hour simulcast of WGN-TV's morning news program that was carried early weekday mornings during the transitional period – immediately ceased being shown on a national basis the day prior, while WGN-TV itself maintained a separate schedule of local and syndicated programs exclusively catering to the Chicago market. The channel began to focus squarely on acquired programming, including shows held over from its superstation era, and by 2015, began to incorporate a limited schedule of original drama and reality series.

Conversion to cable news channel

On September 1, 2020, WGN America launched a three-hour-long prime time newscast, NewsNation, which began development in October 2019, when Nexstar management commissioned research from television subscribers that determined a share of survey participants were dissatisfied with opinion-based programming on cable news channels such as CNN (which had previously offered straight news programming within its evening lineup, before shifting further into liberal-leaning personality-based programming in the mid-2010s), MSNBC (which gravitated toward liberal opinion/talk programs beginning in 2008), and Fox News (developed in 1996 with a conservative-leaning format). The program draws partly from the broadcast and digital resources of Nexstar's television stations (including those acquired by Tribune Media, in addition to WGN America, several months prior).

During December 2020 and January 2021, Nexstar reached carriage agreements that added WGN America to virtual multichannel television providers YouTube TV (reached on December 1), FuboTV (reached on December 11), Hulu (reached on December 18), Sling TV (reached on December 24, through a broader agreement with Sling parent Dish Network which ended a three-week impasse in which the satellite provider lost access to Nexstar's broadcast stations) and Vidgo (reached on January 14) to expand the channel beyond its existing wireline and satellite distribution footprint, and increase exposure for NewsNation. (AT&T TV had already carried the channel since October 2019).

On January 25, 2021, Nexstar Media Group announced it would relaunch WGN America under the NewsNation brand on March 1, cutting all ties with the WGN brand after forty-three years. The name change will coincide with a gradual expansion of its news programming: initially expanding to nine hours per day (from six), the revised news schedule will be fronted by a splintered expansion of the flagship NewsNation broadcast (adding an hour-long early evening edition, alongside the existing and now reduced two-hour NewsNation Prime) and two host-centered news and interview programs anchored respectively by Joe Donlon and Ashleigh Banfield. NewsNation will maintain a reduced schedule of entertainment programs acquired by the channel under the WGN America moniker in daytime and select overnight slots initially; beginning with the launch of a morning news program in 2021, the acquired entertainment shows will be replaced with additional news content once syndication contracts expire.

NewsNation was developed under the management of Sean Compton, who was promoted to executive vice president of WGN America upon completion of the Nexstar purchase, and former WGN-TV news director Jennifer Lyons, who was reassigned by Nexstar to serve as WGN America's vice president of news. However, since its launch, NewsNation was accused of having a rightward tilt due to its guests and for hiring former Fox News Channel chief and White House Deputy Chief of Staff Bill Shine as a consultant. The news director and managing editor quit following disclosure of Shine's role. Lyons announced her resignation in March amid the controversy as well as continued low ratings. Amid dissension from NewsNation staffers, Nexstar's CEO affirmed the schedule to convert NewsNation into an "all-news, talk, and opinion" channel by 2023.

In May 2021, to replace Lyons Nexstar hired Michael Corn, the senior executive producer of Good Morning America, as its news director. Corn then named Fox News vice president Cherie Grzech as managing editor. Later that year, NewsNation premiered more opinion programming hosted by cable news veterans Leland Vittert and Dan Abrams, as well as a morning show hosted by former ABC News presenter Adrienne Bankert.

On October 3, 2022, former CNN anchor Chris Cuomo, who was terminated for advising his brother New York Governor Andrew Cuomo about how to deal with various scandals, joined the network with an evening program called Cuomo to replace NewsNation Prime, thus fully converting evening programming to personality-driven opinion and analysis shows.

Programming

Daytime programming
Live programming begin at 6 a.m. ET with Early Morning with Mitch Carr, followed one hour later by Morning in America hosted by Bankert, a three-hour newscast. At 10 a.m. ET, NewsNation Live, a two-hour straight newscast, airs with Marni Hughes, the only remaining original NewsNation anchor from its 2020 launch. As of 2022, the only non-news program on NewsNation's weekday daytime programming slate is a midday block of Blue Bloods, as the network has steadily added more news programming to its schedule since adopting its current format. Weekends likewise feature Blue Bloods and the sitcom Last Man Standing.

Evening news programming
On January 15, 2020, NewsNation's predecessor, WGN America, announced it would launch a three-hour-long, nightly prime time newscast titled NewsNation, which premiered on September 1, 2020. The program, which is produced from the WGN-TV facility in Chicago, offers non-partisan coverage that is based upon the traditional, straight news style of local television newscasts; it primarily uses the journalistic resources of Nexstar Media Group's 110 television news operations, augmenting an in-house staff of anchors, correspondents and meteorologists (almost all of whom exclusively have backgrounds in local television news).

On March 1, 2021, coinciding with its relaunch under the NewsNation brand, the channel expanded its news programming to include the additions of three programs: NewsNation Early Edition (an hour-long early-evening newscast), The Donlon Report (an hour-long prime-access newscast anchored by Joe Donlon, who was reassigned from the weeknight NewsNation broadcasts) and Banfield (an hour-long weeknight news/interview program hosted by Ashleigh Banfield). The flagship evening newscast was retitled NewsNation Prime, and reduced from three hours to two. News programming began at 6 pm ET and the three programs repeat immediately following the end of Banfield at 11 pm. NewsNation's weekend news programming consists of two hours of NewsNation Prime and a rebroadcast of an episode of Banfield from the previous week.

On July 19, 2021, NewsNation rebranded NewsNation Early Edition to Rush Hour (while keeping the same fast-paced straight news format) and introduced an opinion show, On Balance, hosted by former Fox News correspondent Leland Vittert to replace the first hour of NewsNation Prime. It also announced on that date that on September 27, Dan Abrams would host a prime time news analysis show and that former ABC News correspondent Adrienne Bankert would host a morning show titled Morning in America.

In July 2022, NewsNation announced that Chris Cuomo would host a prime time news analysis show titled Cuomo replacing NewsNation Prime. Rush Hour was moved to 5 p.m. ET and expanded to two hours, essentially replacing NewsNation Prime as the evening newscast of record. Cuomo, Dan Abrams Live, and Banfield repeat at 11 pm.

Availability
NewsNation is available on most multichannel television providers (including cable, satellite, IPTV and fiber-optic-based services) within the United States. However, the channel continues to have somewhat scattershot coverage (outside of satellite distribution) in portions of the Western United States and much of the New England region. Moreover, some multichannel providers in various markets where Tribune Broadcasting had owned a television station prior to the closure of the group's purchase by Nexstar do not carry NewsNation. In the Chicago metropolitan area, NewsNation is carried by the three major cable television providers serving the immediate area (Comcast Xfinity, RCN and WOW!) and streaming providers, in addition to the WGN-TV broadcast signal.

Streaming 
NewsNation streams on YouTube TV, Sling TV, Hulu, DirecTV Stream, and FuboTV.

Radio 
On September 1, 2020, at the same time NewsNation was launched, the NewsNation brand expanded to radio by broadcasting its 2-minute top-of-the-hour news headlines on WGN 720 AM. These audio newscasts are also available to listen nationally on the radio section of the network's website and app.

References

External links

Interview with WGN America

Superstations in the United States
Television channels and stations established in 1978
English-language television stations in the United States
Companies based in Chicago
Nexstar Media Group
24-hour television news channels in the United States